Andırın is a town and district of Kahramanmaraş Province in the Mediterranean region of Turkey.

References

External links
 District governor's official website 

Populated places in Kahramanmaraş Province
Districts of Kahramanmaraş Province
Andırın District
Towns in Turkey